Serafimov is a Slavic masculine surname, its feminine counterpart is Serafimova. It may refer to
Emiliya Serafimova (born 1976), Bulgarian volleyball player
Tanko Serafimov (1942–2013), Bulgarian architect
Vadim Serafimov (born 1949), Soviet diplomat 

Russian-language surnames
Bulgarian-language surnames